Things That Can't Be Undone is the ninth studio album by Corb Lund and the Hurtin' Albertans. It was released by New West Records on October 9, 2015.

Track listing

Personnel

Corb Lund and the Huntin' Albertans
Kurt Ciesla- baritone guitar
Corb Lund- lead vocals, acoustic guitar
Grant Siemans- electric guitar, lap steel guitar
Brady Valgardson- drums

Additional musicians
Dave Cobb- nylon string guitar, percussion
Leroy Powell- background vocals
Kristen Rogers- background vocals

Charts
The album debuted on the Hot Country Albums chart at No. 37, selling 1,100 copies in the US in its first week.

References

2015 albums
Corb Lund and the Hurtin' Albertans albums
Albums produced by Dave Cobb
New West Records albums